Inter Islands Airlines was an airline based in Cape Verde.

Code data
IATA Code: H4
ICAO Code: IIN (not current)

Fleet
Operated a leased Embraer Brasilia

References

Defunct airlines of Cape Verde
Airlines established in 2002
Airlines disestablished in 2009